Kalundborg Airfield, also called Kaldred Airfield, is an airfield located in Kaldred, right next to Saltbæk Vig approx.  outside Kalundborg. The airfield has a 699 meter long and 18 meter wide paved east/west facing runway as well as grass runways north and south of the paved runway.

Kalundborg Airfield is primarily used by the glider clubs Kalundborg Flyveklub and Polyteknisk Flyvegruppe.

The first flight in Denmark with an electric plane took place in 2019 from Kalundborg Airfield.

References

External links

Airports in Denmark
Buildings and structures in Kalundborg Municipality
Transport in Region Zealand